The 2019–20 Chicago Blackhawks season was the 94th season for the National Hockey League franchise that was established on September 25, 1926. The Blackhawks were led by head coach Jeremy Colliton in his first full year as head coach.

The season was suspended by the league officials on March 12, 2020, after several other professional and collegiate sports organizations followed suit as a result of the ongoing COVID-19 pandemic. On May 26, the NHL regular season was officially declared over with the remaining games being cancelled. The Blackhawks advanced to the playoffs for the first time since the 2016–17 season by defeating the Edmonton Oilers, but were defeated in the first round by the Vegas Golden Knights in five games.

Standings

Divisional standings

Western Conference

Tiebreaking procedures
 Fewer number of games played (only used during regular season).
 Greater number of regulation wins (denoted by RW).
 Greater number of wins in regulation and overtime (excluding shootout wins; denoted by ROW).
 Greater number of total wins (including shootouts).
 Greater number of points earned in head-to-head play; if teams played an uneven number of head-to-head games, the result of the first game on the home ice of the team with the extra home game is discarded.
 Greater goal differential (difference between goals for and goals against).
 Greater number of goals scored (denoted by GF).

Schedule and results

Preseason
The preseason schedule was published on June 18, 2019.

Regular season
The regular season schedule was published on June 25, 2019.

Playoffs 

The Blackhawks faced the Edmonton Oilers in the qualifying round, defeating them in four games.

The Blackhawks faced the Vegas Golden Knights in the first round, losing in five games.

Detailed records

Player statistics

Skaters

Goaltenders

†Denotes player spent time with another team before joining the Blackhawks. Stats reflect time with the Blackhawks only.
‡Denotes player was traded mid-season. Stats reflect time with the Blackhawks only.
Bold/italics denotes franchise record.

References

2019-20
2019–20 NHL season by team
Chicago Blackhawks
Chicago Blackhawks
Chicago Blackhawks
Chicago Blackhawks